Various kinds of Arab music are popular in Libya such as Andalusi music, locally known as Ma'luf, Chabi and Arab classical music.

The Tuareg in the south have their own distinctive folk music.  There is little or no pop music industry.  Among the Tuareg, women are the musicians.  They play a one-stringed violin called an anzad, as well as a variety of drums.

Two of the most famous musicians of Libya are Ahmed Fakroun and Mohamed Hassan.

Among Libyan Arabs, instruments include the zokra (a bagpipe), flute (made of bamboo), tambourine, oud (a fretless lute) and darbuka, a goblet drum held sideways and played with the fingers.  Intricate clapping is also common in Libyan folk music.

Traveling Bedouin poet-singers have spread many popular songs across Libya.  Among their styles is huda, the camel driver's song, the rhythm of which is said to mimic the feet of a walking camel.

During the 2011 revolution, the Berber singer Dania Ben Sassi went viral with her songs praising the sacrifices of the Libyan people, sung in Amazight.

References

External links 
  Audio clips: Traditional music of Libya. Musée d'ethnographie de Genève. Accessed November 25, 2010.
Libyan music organization  sound samples available for download.